Gjøvdal (historic: Gjevedal) is a former municipality in the old Aust-Agder county in Norway. The municipality existed from 1908 until its dissolution in 1960. It covered the Gjøv river valley and the surrounding moors.  It is currently part of the municipality of Åmli in Agder county. The administrative centre was the village of Askland where Gjøvdal Church is located.

History
The parish of Gjøvdal was part of the municipality of Åmli since 1 January 1838 (see formannskapsdistrikt law). On 1 January 1908, the municipality of Åmli was split into three separate municipalities: Gjevedal (population: 590), Lille Topdal (population: 389), and Åmli (population: 2,024). In 1911, the name Gjevedal was changed to "Gjøvdal".

During the 1960s, there were many municipal mergers across Norway due to the work of the Schei Committee. On 1 January 1960, the municipality of Gjøvdal (population: 362) was reunited with Åmli (population: 1,947) to form a new, enlarged Åmli municipality. (The municipality of Tovdal was merged into Åmli in 1967.)

Name
The municipality (originally the parish) is named after the Gjevedal valley. The first element is the name of the river Gjøv which flows through the valley.  means "to give (as in a reward to the fisherman)". The last element is dalr which means "valley" or "dale".

Government
All municipalities in Norway, including Gjøvdal, are responsible for primary education (through 10th grade), outpatient health services, senior citizen services, unemployment and other social services, zoning, economic development, and municipal roads. The municipality was governed by a municipal council of elected representatives, which in turn elected a mayor.

Municipal council
The municipal council  of Gjøvdal was made up of 13 representatives that were elected to four year terms.  The party breakdown of the final municipal council was as follows:

See also
List of former municipalities of Norway

References

External links

Åmli
Former municipalities of Norway
1908 establishments in Norway
1960 disestablishments in Norway